The helmeted worm lizard (Amphisbaena acangaoba) is a worm lizard species in the family Amphisbaenidae. It is endemic to Brazil.

References

acangaoba
Reptiles described in 2020
Endemic fauna of Brazil
Reptiles of Brazil
Taxa named by Leonardo de Barros Ribeiro
Taxa named by Samuel Campos Gomides
Taxa named by Henrique Caldeira Costa